The 2013 All-Ireland Intermediate Hurling Championship was the 30th staging of the All-Ireland hurling championship since its establishment by the Gaelic Athletic Association in 1961. The championship began on 2 June 2013 and ended on 31 August 2013.

Tipperary were the defending champions and successfully retained the title after defeating Kilkenny by 2–14 to 2–11 in the All-Ireland final.

Team summaries

Results

Munster Intermediate Hurling Championship

All-Ireland Intermediate Hurling Championship

Statistics

Top scorers
Overall

Single game

Scoring

First goal of the championship
Aidan Lynch for Clare against Waterford (Munster quarter-final)
Widest winning margin: 11 points
Clare 2-21 - 0-16 Waterford (Munster quarter-final)
Most goals in a match:  4
Tipperary 2-14 - 2-11 Kilkenny (All-Ireland final)
Most points in a match: 37
Clare 2-21 - 0-16 Waterford (Munster quarter-final)
Tipperary 0-19 - 0-18 Cork (Munster final)
Most goals by one team in a match: 2
Clare 2-21 - 0-16 Waterford (Munster quarter-final)
Cork 2-13 - 1-9 Clare (Munster semi-final)
Tipperary 2-14 - 2-11 Kilkenny (All-Ireland final)
 Highest aggregate score: 43
Clare 2-21 - 0-16 Waterford (Munster quarter-final)
Most goals scored by a losing team: 2
Kilkenny 2-11 - 2-14 Tipperary (All-Ireland final)

External links
 2013 Munster Intermediate Hurling Championship fixtures

References

Intermediate
All-Ireland Intermediate Hurling Championship